The Indian River is a river of Barbados. It iss located in Spring Garden.

Essentially no longer in existence due to modern landscaping and  much improved drainage in the area, it withered away and 'disappeared' in the mid-20th.Century, some time after about 1970. At best, it might today be described as a seasonal watercourse.

See also
List of rivers of Barbados

References

Rivers of Barbados